Milaca is a city and the county seat of Mille Lacs County, Minnesota. The population was 2,946 at the time of the 2010 census. It is situated on the Rum River.

History
A post office has been in operation at Milaca since 1883. The name Milaca is derived from shortening and alteration of Mille Lacs Lake.

Geography

U.S. Highway 169 and Minnesota Highway 23 are two of the main routes in the city.

Climate

Demographics

2010 census
As of the census of 2010, there were 2,946 people, 1,308 households, and 691 families living in the city. The racial makeup of the city was 96.1% White, 0.4% African American, 1.4% Native American, 0.3% Asian, 0.1% from other races, and 1.6% from two or more races. Hispanic or Latino of any race were 0.6% of the population.

There were 1,308 households, of which 26.9% had children under the age of 18 living with them, 37.2% were married couples living together, 11.4% had a female householder with no husband present, 4.3% had a male householder with no wife present, and 47.2% were non-families. 40.6% of all households were made up of individuals, and 21.7% had someone living alone who was 65 years of age or older. The average household size was 2.12 and the average family size was 2.84.

The median age in the city was 39.7 years. 21.5% of residents were under the age of 18; 8.7% were between the ages of 18 and 24; 25.8% were from 25 to 44; 20.6% were from 45 to 64; and 23.5% were 65 years of age or older. The gender makeup of the city was 48.1% male and 51.9% female.

2000 census
As of the census of 2000, there were 2,580 people, 1,115 households, and 636 families living in the city. The racial makeup of the city was 96.67% White, 0.12% African American, 1.28% Native American, 0.19% Asian, 0.04% from other races, and 1.71% from two or more races. Hispanic or Latino of any race were 0.97% of the population.

There were 1,115 households, out of which 26.1% had children under the age of 18 living with them, 43.0% were married couples living together, 10.9% had a female householder with no husband present, and 42.9% were non-families. 39.0% of all households were made up of individuals, and 19.7% had someone living alone who was 65 years of age or older. The average household size was 2.14 and the average family size was 2.82.

In the city, the population was spread out, with 22.5% under the age of 18, 8.1% from 18 to 24, 24.6% from 25 to 44, 19.2% from 45 to 64, and 25.5% who were 65 years of age or older. The median age was 40 years. For every 100 females, there were 81.8 males. For every 100 females age 18 and over, there were 77.4 males.

The median income for a household in the city was $26,964, and the median income for a family was $40,739. Males had a median income of $35,250 versus $24,531 for females. The per capita income for the city was $17,005. About 10.4% of families and 15.6% of the population were below the poverty line, including 16.4% of those under age 18 and 21.2% of those age 65 or over.

Education
Milaca Public Schools is composed of Milaca Elementary and Milaca High School. The elementary and secondary schools are connected to form one school toward the west of the city, along Highway 23 and the Rum River. There are approximately 1,900 students Pre-K through 12th grade, and around 130 teachers. The high school has a science and research forest. There are 11 varsity sports and reputable music and arts programs. The Star Tribune ranked the music program best in the state. Each summer the marching band receives very high rankings for their performances. The teams are the Milaca Wolves. There is also special education, community education, an Area Learning Center (ALC), and gifted education programming.
Milaca also hosts the world's largest high school cross-country meet, The Milaca Mega-Meet.

ALC
The Milaca School District has an alternative high school that is separate from the main high school. The Milaca ALC (Area Learning Center) aims to educate students who need to repeat classes or have other life challenges and require a different education style and format. The ALC enrolls approximately 40 to 50 students ages 16–19, with four fully licensed high school teachers. Students can earn .5 credits per class in one quarter, as opposed to .5 credits per class in one semester at the high school. Classes are longer: an hour and a half for day classes and two hours for after-school classes. Several required courses can be completed as an independent study under the guidance and direction of the classroom teacher. The ALC offers no extracurricular activities, but students can participate in extra courses and activities at the main high school. While the majority of Milaca ALC students live within the Milaca School District, students from outside the district can enroll and earn credits for graduation. The ALC is many students' last chance to earn a high school diploma.

Infrastructure

Transportation
Milaca is served by the Milaca Municipal Airport.

Major highways
The following routes pass through Milaca:

  U.S. Highway 169
  Minnesota State Highway 23

References

External links

City of Milaca, MN – Official Website
Mille Lacs County Times
Mille Lacs Messenger newspaper site
Milaca Public School Official Site

Cities in Minnesota
Cities in Mille Lacs County, Minnesota
County seats in Minnesota